This is a list of Arabic star names. In Western astronomy, most of the accepted star names are Arabic, a few are Greek and some are of unknown origin. Typically only bright stars have names.

History of Arabic star names

Very old star names originated among people who lived in the Arabian Peninsula more than a thousand years ago, after the rise of Islam. However, some Arabic language star names sprang up later in history, as translations of ancient Greek language descriptions.

The astronomer Claudius Ptolemy in his Almagest (2nd century) tabulated the celestial position and brightness (visual magnitude) of 1,025 stars. Ptolemy's book was translated into Arabic in the 8th and 9th centuries and became famous in Europe as a 12th-century Latin translation. Many of the Arabic-language star descriptions in the Almagest came to be widely used as names for stars.

Ptolemy used a strategy of "figure reference" to identify stars according to their position within a familiar constellation or asterism (e.g., "in the right shoulder of The Hunter"). Muslim astronomers adopted some of these as proper names for stars, and added names from traditional Arabic star lore, which they recorded in various Zij treatises. The most notable of these is the Book of Fixed Stars written by the Muslim astronomer Abd al-Rahman al-Sufi (known as Azophi in the West), who thoroughly illustrated all the stars known to him along with their observations, descriptions, positions, magnitudes, brightness, and color.

In Europe, during the Middle Ages and Renaissance, many ancient star names were copied or translated incorrectly by various writers, some of whom did not know the Arabic language very well. As a result, the history of a star's name can be complicated.

In 2016, the IAU designated official star names to resolve the difficulty of using different naming systems. Many stars were given the commonly used Arabic name.

A

Star Groups 

In Arabic astronomy, Draco was divided into three parts:

 Alawaid, the first part and the main body of Draco, also called الْرُّبَع ar-Rubaʽ.
 Arrakis
 Azfar Adib

B

C

D

E

F

G

H

I

J

K

L

M

N

O

P

R

S

T

U

V

W

Y

Z

Others

See also
Islamic astronomy
List of proper names of stars
Lists of astronomical objects

References

 Islamic Crescents' Observation Project (ICOP) website, which in turn cites
Paul Kunitzsch, Tim Smart, Short Guide to Modern Star Names and Their Derivations (1986);
Guy Ottewell, The Astronomical Companion;
Abdul-Rahim Bader, Rasd al-Sama ("Observing the Sky");
Hamid Al-Naimy Elm al-Falak ("Astronomy").

External links
 ICOP: Arabic Star Names 
 Kaler, James, "Star Names: Proper Names", University of Illinois
The Astronomy Corner: Reference – Star Names v1.1.2 (2006-05-28) from web.archive.org
 Lebling, Robert W., "Arabic in the Sky", Saudi Aramco World magazine, September/October 2010, v.61, n.5

Arabic
Stars
Arabic star names
Stars
Arabic star names